Moulins is a commune in central France, capital of the Allier department. It is located on the river Allier.

Among its many tourist attractions are the Maison Mantin, the Anne de Beaujeu Museum and The National Center of Costume and Scenography.

Geography
Moulins is located on the banks of the river Allier.

Moulins-sur-Allier station, in the centre of the town, has direct trains to Paris (Gare de Bercy), which take about 2 hours 25 minutes. The A79 motorway passes south of the town. Montbeugny Airport is a small airport located near Moulins.

History
Before the French Revolution, Moulins was the capital of the province of Bourbonnais and the seat of the Dukes of Bourbon. It appears in documented records at least as far back as the year 990. In 1232, Archambaud VIII, Sire de Bourbon granted a franchise to the village's inhabitants.

The town achieved greater prominence in 1327, when Charles IV elevated Louis I de Clermont to Duke of Bourbon. Either Louis or the later Peter II, Duke of Bourbon and of Auvergne moved the capital of the province from Bourbon-l'Archambault to Moulins.

Note:  This article in French suggests Pierre II moved the capital, while the local tourism website (also in French) suggests it was Louis I.

In February 1566 it became eponymous to the Edict of Moulins, an important royal ordinance dealing with many aspects of the administration of justice and feudal and ecclesiastical privilege, including limitations on the appanages held by French princes, abrogation of the levy of rights of tallage claimed by seigneurs over their dependants, and provisions for a system of concessions on rivers.

This was the birthplace of the great 19th-century operatic baritone and art collector Jean-Baptiste Faure. In the 20th century, Coco Chanel went to school in Moulins as an orphan, before moving to Paris, where she became a fashion designer and major innovator in women's clothing.

Politics and administration

Territorial division 
Moulins in the préfecture of Allier, even though it is not the most populated commune of the department.

Elections to municipal and intercommunal councils

Mayors of Moulins 

The position of mayor has existed in Moulins since 1518. The current mayor is Pierre-André Périssol, in office since 1995 and last re-elected at the 2020 elections.

Other elections

International relations 

Moulins is twinned with:
 Bad Vilbel, Germany since 26 October 1990
 Montepulciano, Italy

Population

Museums
 Centre National du Costume de Scene (museum)

Notable people 
 Antoine Gilbert Griffet de Labaume (1756–1805), translator and man of letters                                                                                  
 Théodore de Banville (1823–1891), poet and playwright
 Jean Pastelot (1820–1870), painter and caricaturist
 Coco Chanel, fashion designer, started as a cabaret singer
 Philippe N'Dioro, footballer
 Jean-Luc Perrot (born 1959), pipe organ player and composer
 Stéphane Risacher, basketball player for the French national team
 Jean-Baptiste Faure, opera singer
 Claude Louis Hector de Villars (1653–1734), Marshal General of France
 Gilbert Mercier (1957), author of "The Orwellian Empire" and journalist
 Louis Jacques Brunet (1811), ancient professor of natural history
 James FitzJames, 1st Duke of Berwick (1670–1734)
 Rahel Shtainshnaider,footballer

See also
 Moulins Cathedral
 Diocese of Moulins
 AS Moulins
Communes of the Allier department

References

External links 

 City council website (in French)
 Local tourism website (in French)
 Picture of Moulins Cathedral

 
Communes of Allier
Prefectures in France
Bourbonnais
Allier communes articles needing translation from French Wikipedia